The 1984 season was the Cincinnati Bengals' 15th season in the National Football League (NFL), their 17th overall, and their first under head coach Sam Wyche.  The team lost their first five games, before winning eight of their final eleven games to finish the season with a .500 record.

The season was the first for head coach Sam Wyche, who had replaced former coach Forrest Gregg after Gregg had resigned following the previous season. Wyche had been the head coach at Indiana University in 1983.

The club stumbled out of the gate, and went winless in September en route to a 1–6 start. However, the team began a turnaround, and by December, was one of the hottest teams in the league. The team won seven out of their last nine games, including a crucial win against their division rival Pittsburgh Steelers in week 11.

In the final week of the season, Cincinnati needed to win, and hope for the Steelers to lose at the Raiders, to secure an improbable AFC Central division title. The Bengals did their part, routing the Bills 52–21, and finished the season 8–8. Later in the day, the Bengals were forced to "scoreboard watch." The Steelers, however, managed to beat the Raiders, clinching the division, and effectively eliminating the Bengals from the playoffs.

In a 2018 article from FiveThirtyEight, the 1984 Cincinnati Bengals team is rated as the most average team in the history of American sports. They both scored and allowed 339 points in addition to their 8–8 record.

Offseason

NFL Draft

Roster

Regular season

Schedule

Note: Intra-division opponents are in bold text.

Game summaries

Week 6

Week 7

Week 8

Week 10 (Sunday, November 4, 1984): at San Francisco 49ers 

Point spread: 49ers by 10½
 Over/Under: 43.0 (under)
 Time of Game:

Week 11

Standings

References

External links
 1984 Cincinnati Bengals at Pro-Football-Reference.com

Cincinnati Bengals
Cincinnati Bengals seasons
1984 in sports in Ohio